Julia Elizabeth Annas (born 1946) is a British philosopher who has taught in the United States for the last quarter-century. She is Regents Professor of Philosophy Emerita at the University of Arizona.

Education and career
Annas graduated from Oxford University in 1968 with a B.A. and from Harvard University with an A.M. (1970) and a Ph.D. (1972). She was a Fellow and Tutor at St Hugh's College, Oxford for fifteen years before joining the faculty at the University of Arizona in 1986, where she taught until her retirement, apart for one year as a professor at Columbia University.

She specializes in the study of ancient Greek philosophy, including ethics, psychology, and epistemology. 
She was elected a Fellow of the American Academy of Arts and Sciences in 1992 and a member of the American Philosophical Society in 2013. She is the founder and former editor of the annual journal Oxford Studies in Ancient Philosophy. She is married to Hume scholar David Owen, also a professor of philosophy at the University of Arizona.

She is a member of the Norwegian Academy of Science and Letters.

Philosophical work
Julia Annas has advocated ethics based on character, building on ideas attributed to Greek philosopher Aristotle and making them relevant for contemporary moral discourse. She has argued that being virtuous involves "practical reasoning" which can be compared to the "exercising of a practical skill". Hence, she argues, rather than relating virtues to rules, principles, or an end goal, Annas says, first, people should ask how they can improve their moral "skills".

Selected publications

Books
Virtue and Law in Plato and Beyond (Oxford, 2017)
Intelligent Virtue (Oxford, 2011)
Plato: A Very Short Introduction (Oxford, 2003)
Ancient Philosophy: A Very Short Introduction (Oxford, 2000)
Voices of Ancient Philosophy: An Introductory Reader (Oxford, 2000)
Platonic Ethics, Old and New (Cornell, 1999)
 (reprint 1995)
Hellenistic Philosophy of Mind (California, 1992)
The Modes of Scepticism (Cambridge, 1985), with Jonathan Barnes
An Introduction to Plato's Republic (Oxford, 1981)
Aristotle's Metaphysics, Books M and N, translated with introduction and notes (Oxford, 1976)

Translations
Plato, Statesman (Cambridge, 1995), with Robin Waterfield.
Sextus Empiricus, Outlines of Scepticism (Cambridge, 1994), with Jonathan Barnes.
Aristotle, Aristotle's Metaphysics Books M and N (Oxford, 1976).

Articles
"What are Plato's "Middle" Dialogues in the Middle Of?" (Harvard University Press, 2002)
"Democritus and Eudaimonism" (Presocratic Philosophy: Essays in Honour of Alex Mourelatos, edited by Victor Caston and Daniel Graham, Ashgate, Aldershot, 2002)
"Aristotle and Kant on Morality and Practical Reasoning" (Aristotle, Kant & The Stoics,ed. S. Ergstrom and J. Whiting, Cambridge 1996)
"Virtue and Eudaimonism" (Virtue and Vice, ed. E. Paul, J. Jaul and F. Miller, Cambridge, 1998)
"Prudence and Morality in Ancient and Modern Ethics" (Ethics, January 1995)
"Epicurus on Agency" (Passions and Perceptions, Cambridge, 1993)
"The Good Life and the Good Lives of Others" (The Good Life and the Human Good, Cambridge, 1992)
"Plato the Sceptic" (Oxford Studies in Ancient Philosophy, Supp. Vol., 1992).
"Plato's Myths of Judgement" (Phronesis Vol. 27 No. 2, 1982; pp. 119–143).

See also
American philosophy
List of American philosophers
Sigmund H. Danziger, Jr. Memorial Lecture in the Humanities

References

External links
Profile at University of Arizona

1946 births
21st-century American philosophers
Philosophers from Arizona
British women philosophers
Harvard University alumni
British scholars of ancient Greek philosophy
University of Arizona faculty
Columbia University faculty
Living people
Fellows of St Hugh's College, Oxford
Alumni of the University of Oxford
Fellows of the American Academy of Arts and Sciences
American women philosophers
British philosophers
20th-century American philosophers
British ethicists
Virtue ethicists
American ethicists
Greek–English translators
20th-century American women
21st-century American women
Members of the Norwegian Academy of Science and Letters
Members of the American Philosophical Society
Women classical scholars